William Hickey may refer to:

William Hickey (actor) (1927–1997), American actor
William Hickey (columnist), pseudonymous byline for a column in the Daily Express
William Hickey (memoirist) (1749–1830), English lawyer and author of a famous set of memoirs
William Hickey (writer) (1787–1875), Irish philanthropist
William J. Hickey (1873–1953), New York politician and judge
William A. Hickey (1869–1933), American prelate of the Roman Catholic Church
William F. Hickey Jr., (1929–2016), Connecticut politician and judge